Bekim Kapić (born 2 January 1979) is a retired Slovenian football defender.

He has been capped for the Slovenian national team.

References
 

1979 births
Living people
Slovenian people of Bosnia and Herzegovina descent
Slovenian footballers
Association football defenders
NK Ivančna Gorica players
FC Koper players
NK Mura players
Slovenian PrvaLiga players
Enosis Neon Paralimni FC players
Cypriot First Division players
Cypriot Second Division players
Slovenian expatriate footballers
Slovenian expatriate sportspeople in Cyprus
Expatriate footballers in Cyprus
Ayia Napa FC players
NK Celje players
Slovenia international footballers
Slovenian expatriate sportspeople in Hungary
Expatriate footballers in Hungary
Szeged-Csanád Grosics Akadémia footballers